Vägga IP  is a football stadium in Karlshamn, Sweden  and the home stadium for the football teams Högadals IS and IFK Karlshamn.

References 

Football venues in Sweden